Duncan MacKay (14 July 1937 – 23 December 2019) was a Scottish footballer who played for Celtic, Third Lanark, Melbourne Croatia, Perth Azzurri and the Scotland national team.

Born in Glasgow, Mackay turned professional when he joined Celtic from Maryhill Harp, aged 17, in 1955. He developed rapidly, making his club debut within two years and earning the first of an eventual 14 caps for the Scottish national side four years later.

Celtic manager Jimmy McGrory's attempts to rejuvenate his side eventually resulted in MacKay's departure from Celtic Park after over 200 first team appearances, the fullback moving to south Glasgow side Third Lanark in November 1964. Thirds were relegated at the end of the 1964–65 season and MacKay was one of several players released.

MacKay opted to move to Australia at this juncture, joining Melbourne Croatia of the Victorian State League.  He helped the side to the State title in 1968 and several Dockerty Cup triumphs but left when Croatia were suspended following crowd disturbances in 1972. He returned to Scotland and joined junior club St Anthony's as a player-coach for two years before deciding upon a second stint in Australia. After playing for Perth Azzurri between 1974 and 1977 he coached with South Melbourne and Croatia (now known as Essendon Lions), the latter as Captain-Coach.

MacKay died on 23 December 2019, aged 82.

Honours 
Celtic
Scottish Cup: Runners-up 1960–61, 1962–63
Glasgow Charity Cup: 1958–59

Melbourne Knights 
Victorian State League: 1968

State League Cup: 1971
Dockerty Cup: 1968, 1969
Ampol Cup: 1968, 1971, 1972

Perth Azzuri
NPL WA Premiers: 1975, 1976
Night Series: 1975
Top Four Cup: 1976

Individual
Celtic FC Player of the Year: 1963
Melbourne Knights Player of the Year: 1968

References

External links

Profile of MacKay's Australian career at sesasport.com

1937 births
2019 deaths
Footballers from Glasgow
Scottish footballers
Association football fullbacks
Scotland international footballers
Celtic F.C. players
Third Lanark A.C. players
Melbourne Knights FC players
Maryhill Harp F.C. players
Scottish Junior Football Association players
Scottish Football League players
Scottish football managers
Scottish expatriate football managers
South Melbourne FC managers
Scotland under-23 international footballers
Scottish expatriate footballers
Expatriate soccer managers in Australia
Expatriate soccer players in Australia
Scottish expatriate sportspeople in Australia